Union Chapel (or the Oak Bluffs Christian Union Chapel) is an historic octagon-shaped church building  in Oak Bluffs, on Martha's Vineyard, Massachusetts.  The church was built in 1870 as a non-sectarian worship space in an area dominated by the Methodist summer camp meeting known as Wesleyan Grove.  Acquired in 2002 by the nonprofit Martha's Vineyard Preservation Trust, the building continues to be used for nonsectarian religious services, and also serves as a community center and performing arts space.

History
The area now called Oak Bluffs, Massachusetts on the island of Martha's Vineyard began to develop in the 1830s with the establishment of a Methodist summer camp meeting which became known as Wesleyan Grove.  The popularity of the camp prompted the formation of the Oak Bluffs Land and Wharf Company to develop areas adjacent to the camp as a resort area.

The chapel was built in 1870 as a non-denominational house of worship for vacationers who were not Methodist.  The church, an eight-sided structure with an open internal plan, was designed by local architect Samuel Freeman Pratt, whose work for the Company included its headquarters building.

The church was listed on the National Register of Historic Places on June 7, 1990.  In 2002 the building was acquired by the Martha's Vineyard Preservation Trust.  The building continues to be used for services on a seasonal basis, and is also used for community events and as a performing arts space.

See also
National Register of Historic Places listings in Dukes County, Massachusetts
List of octagonal buildings and structures in the United States

References

External links
 Martha's Vineyard Preservation Trust homepage for Union Chapel

Buildings and structures in Oak Bluffs, Massachusetts
Churches on the National Register of Historic Places in Massachusetts
National Register of Historic Places in Dukes County, Massachusetts
Chapels in the United States
Octagonal churches in the United States
1870 establishments in Massachusetts